Lauren Akins ( Gregory) (born November 8, 1989) is an American author, podcaster, and philanthropist. She is the author of Live in Love: Growing Together Through Life's Changes, which was a New York Times best seller.

Early life
Akins grew up in Madison, Tennessee and attended Goodpasture Christian School. Her parents are Steve and Lisa Gregory. She has a younger sister, Macy, and a younger brother, Grayson.

Akins attended the University of Tennessee, receiving a degree in nursing.

Career
Akins worked with a non-profit advocacy organization, 147 Million Orphans. She donated over $250,000 at an event for the organization in October 2016.

On May 5, 2021, Akins released her book, Live in Love: Growing Together Through Life's Changes, a memoir which she wrote with Mark Dagostino. The book is a New York Times best seller.

In May 2021, Akins released an eight-episode podcast, Live in Love with Lauren Akins, which is co-hosted by Annie F. Downs. In October 2021, season two of the podcast premiered.

Personal life
Akins married country musician Thomas Rhett Akins on October 12, 2012. They met in first grade and became friends in middle school before later starting to date. In 2017, they announced that they were adopting a baby girl from Uganda who was born November 1, 2015, and were also expecting. Their second daughter was born on August 12, 2017. On July 23, 2019, they announced that they were expecting their third daughter. Their third was born on February 10, 2020. Their fourth daughter was born on November 15, 2021.

Akins is a Christian.

References

Living people
American memoirists
American women memoirists
American women podcasters
American podcasters
21st-century American women
University of Tennessee alumni
Writers from Nashville, Tennessee
1989 births